The Maryborough Football & Netball Club, nicknamed the Magpies, is an Australian rules football and netball club based in the town of Maryborough, Victoria.

The club teams currently compete in the Bendigo Football Netball League.

History
Maryborough were Ballarat Football League premiers on four occasions from 1924 to 1931 but missed both the 1929 and 1930 seasons as they were without a home ground. The council had decided to allocate Princess Park to the Maryborough District Football Association (MDFA).

After returning and winning the 1931 premiership, Maryborough applied to join the Bendigo league and were suspended from the Ballarat league as a result. From 1932 to 1940, a separate club called Maryborough United participated in the Bendigo league.

The original club reformed in 1945 and they spent a season in the MDFA before returning to the Ballarat league in 1946.

At the end of 1991 the club were successful in transferring to the Bendigo Football League.

Premierships
 Maryborough Football Association (1892–1915, 1945):
 1892
 Ballarat Football League (1924–1931, 1946–1991): 
 1924, 1925, 1927, 1931, 1960, 1965, 1968, 1972, 1974
 Bendigo Football League (1932–1940, 1992–present): 
 1998, 1999

Notable players

1897 – Tom Banks ( player and administrator)
1935 – Gordon Jones (Melbourne Football Club)
1953 – Ron Branton (Richmond captain and Best & Fairest winner
1956 – Don Nicholls -  
1957 – John Nicholls (Carlton footballer) (Australian Football Hall of Fame "Legend")
1975 – Russell Ohlsen (Collingwood & Carlton)
1920 – Colin Watson (St Kilda (1925 Brownlow Medal winner & 1927 premiership captain / coach)
1884 – Jack Worrall ( player,  and  coach and administrator)
2010 – Stewart Crameri (Essendon player)
2004 – Jed Adcock (Brisbane player)

References

External links

 SportingPulse: Sportingpulse site
 Teamapp site

Sports clubs established in 1872
Australian rules football clubs established in 1872
1872 establishments in Australia
Ballarat Football League clubs
Maryborough, Victoria
Netball teams in Victoria (Australia)